The Longford Senior Football Championship is an annual Gaelic Athletic Association competition organised by Longford GAA among the Senior grade Gaelic football clubs in County Longford, Ireland. The winning club qualifies to represent its county in the Leinster Senior Club Football Championship, the winner of which progresses to the All-Ireland Senior Club Football Championship.

The current champions are Colmcille, winning their seventh SFC title in October 2022. The Longford Slashers club has won more titles (16) than any other club, while Clonguish holds the record for most consecutive wins (4) in 1962, 1963, 1964 and 1965.

History
The Longford Senior Football Championship was first played in 1890, and a total of 105 championships have been successfully completed between 1890 and 2022. The Seán Connolly cup is presented to the winners of the Longford Senior Football Championship. The cup was first presented in 1960.

Mullinalaghta St Columba's and Colmcille played each other in the 2022 final, the first time the neighbouring clubs had met at this stage of the competition since 1952.

Roll of honour

List of finals

References

External links
Longford GAA Website

 
Senior Gaelic football county championships